National Mills Day is an event in the United Kingdom. It occurs annually on the second Sunday in May. It started off as a single day event, but expanded to include Saturday as well as Sunday, and is now promoted as National Mills Weekend. The event is coordinated by the Wind and Watermills section of the Society for the Protection of Ancient Buildings. Traditionally, many preserved wind and watermills that are usually closed to the general public open their doors and offer an insight into the mill workings and history.

In support of National Mills Day, Denby Dale Radio Club coordinates hundreds of amateur radio stations who operate from alongside and sometimes inside the mills.

Similar events
Elsewhere in Europe, similar events are held in Germany, the Netherlands, Switzerland and other countries. Germany has the Deutscher Mühlentag on Whit Monday. The Netherlands holds its Landelijke Molendag on the second Saturday in May.

References

External links
 Mills On The Air
 Denby Dale Radio Club

Public holidays in the United Kingdom
May observances
Windmills in the United Kingdom